Bomaye may refer to:

 "Bomaye" (Sleiman song), a 2016 song by Danish rapper Sleiman
 "Bomaye" (En?gma song), a 2020 song by Italian rapper En?gma